is a railway station in the city of Toyama, Toyama Prefecture, Japan, operated by the private railway operator Toyama Chihō Railway.

Lines

Station layout 
The station has one ground-level side platform serving a single bi-directional track.

History
Hongū Station was opened on 1 October 1937.

Adjacent stations

Surrounding area 
Tateyamasanroku ski area
Gokurakuzaka ski area

See also
 List of railway stations in Japan

External links

 

Railway stations in Toyama Prefecture
Railway stations in Japan opened in 1931
Stations of Toyama Chihō Railway